Introducing Eric Kloss is the debut album by saxophonist Eric Kloss which was recorded in 1965 and released on the Prestige label.

Reception

AllMusic stated: "And what an introduction. The 16-year-old Eric Kloss joins forces with organist Don Patterson in what is a top-flight date for both of them... Kloss combined with the others in this quartet to produce a hard bop, organ jazz session that stands with the best".

Track listing 
All compositions by Eric Kloss, except as noted.
 "Close Your Eyes" (Bernice Petkere) - 6:45  
 "Old Folks" (Dedette Lee Hill, Willard Robison) - 5:45  
 "'S 'Bout Time" (Don Patterson) - 8:05  
 "That's the Way It Is" - 5:29  
 "All Blues" (Miles Davis) - 5:37  
 "Embraceable You" (George Gershwin, Ira Gershwin) - 4:30  
Recorded at Van Gelder Studio in Englewood Cliffs, New Jersey on September 1, 1965

Personnel 
Eric Kloss - alto saxophone, tenor saxophone
Don Patterson - organ
Pat Martino - guitar
Billy James - drums

References 

1965 debut albums
Eric Kloss albums
Prestige Records albums
Albums recorded at Van Gelder Studio
Albums produced by Cal Lampley